is a women's football club playing in Japan's football league, Challenge League. Its hometown is the city of Takahashi.

Squad

Current squad
As of April. 15, 2018

Results

Transition of team name

Kibi International University LSC : 2000 - 2010
FC Takahashi Kibi International University Charme : 2011 – 2012
FC Kibi International University Charme : 2013 – 2017
Kibi International University Charme Okayama Takahashi : 2018 – Present

References

External links 
 F.C. Kibi International University Charme official site
 Japanese Club Teams

Women's football clubs in Japan
2012 establishments in Japan
Japan Women's Football League teams
Sports teams in Okayama Prefecture